Aspergillus spelunceus is a species of fungus in the genus Aspergillus. It is from the Nidulantes section. The species was first described in 1965. It has been isolated from dead cane crickets on the floor of Laurel Creek Cave in West Virginia, United States.

References 

spelunceus
Fungi described in 1965